Phases is a compilation album by American musician Angel Olsen. It was released November 10, 2017 through Jagjaguwar.

Accolades

Track listing

Charts

References

2017 compilation albums
Angel Olsen albums
Jagjaguwar albums
Albums recorded at Electro-Vox Recording Studios